Air Belgium S.A was a Belgian airline. The airline was launched in May 1979 as a leisure carrier and operated until October 2000.

History

On 3 May 1979, tour operator Sun International combined charter airline Abelag Airways and Herfurth into one company.  The airline began operations with a Boeing 707 and a Boeing 737-200, flying from Brussels Airport to destinations in the Mediterranean. The following year, after the withdrawal of one of its business partners, the company was renamed Air Belgium.

In 1990, in addition to European/Mediterranean destinations operated, the airline launched operations to destinations such as the United States and Mexico.

In 1998, Air Belgium was sold to Airtours. By the end of October 2000, Air Belgium had ceased all flight operations.

References

External links

Official website

Defunct airlines of Belgium
Airlines established in 1979
Airlines disestablished in 2000
Defunct charter airlines
Belgian companies established in 1979
2000 disestablishments in Belgium